This is a list of high schools in Chiba Prefecture.

Prefectural
 
 
 
 Narita Kokusai High School

Municipal
 Inage Senior High School (Chiba)

Private
 Ichikawa Gakuen Junior and Senior High School
 Makuhari Junior and Senior High School
  (成田高等学校・付属中学校)

See also
 List of junior high schools in Chiba Prefecture
 List of elementary schools in Chiba Prefecture
 List of schools in Narita, Chiba

References

High schools in Japan
Chiba Prefecture